Silver perchlorate is the chemical compound with the formula AgClO4. This white solid forms a monohydrate and is mildly deliquescent.  It is a useful source of the Ag+ ion, although the presence of perchlorate presents risks.  It is used as a catalyst in organic chemistry.

Production
Silver perchlorate is created by heating a mixture of perchloric acid with silver nitrate.

Alternatively, it can be prepared by the reaction between barium perchlorate and silver sulfate, or from the reaction of perchloric acid with silver oxide.

Solubility
Silver perchlorate is noteworthy for its solubility in aromatic solvents such as benzene (52.8 g/L) and toluene (1010 g/L).  In these solvents, the silver cation binds to the arene, as has been demonstrated by extensive crystallographic studies on crystals obtained from such solutions. Its solubility in water is extremely high, up to 500 g per 100 mL water.

Related reagents
Similar to silver nitrate, silver perchlorate is an effective reagent for replacing halides ligands with perchlorate, which is a weakly or non-coordinating anion.  The use of silver perchlorate in chemical synthesis has declined due to concerns about explosiveness of perchlorate salts.  Other silver reagents are silver tetrafluoroborate, and the related silver trifluoromethanesulfonate and silver hexafluorophosphate.

References

Perchlorates
Silver compounds
Deliquescent substances
Oxidizing agents